Mërgim Brahimi (born 8 August 1992) is a Kosovan professional footballer who plays as a midfielder for FC Wil. A youth international for Albania and Switzerland, Brahimi represented the Albania national team once in a friendly. He switched, and represents the Kosovo national team.

Early life
Brahimi was born in Istog, FR Yugoslavia to Kosovar Albanian parents. He lived in Istog for two years before moving to Zürich, Switzerland along with his mother, brother and two sisters due to the growing tension in Kosovo. Prior to moving, his father had been living for a number of years in Switzerland as a Gastarbeiter. He then signed for local side FC Red Star Zürich in 1997 before being spotted by Grasshopper Club Zürich in 2007.

Club career

Youth clubs
At the age of five, Brahimi signed for local side FC Red Star Zürich before being spotted by Grasshopper Zürich in 2007. Brahimi moved up the ranks of the youth divisions at Grasshopper Zürich, eventually playing for the under-21s in 2010. In the under-21s, Brahimi made a total of thirty two appearances and scored three goals before joining the senior team.

Grasshopper Club Zürich
Brahimi made his first team appearance against city rivals FC Zürich on 2 October 2011. He came on in the 21st minute and made a good impact, in a game that was later abandoned due to FC Zürich fan violence. A 3–0 victory was awarded to GC.

Brahimi made his first starting appearance in the second round of the Schweizer Cup against FC Chiasso on 16 October 2011. He started the game and was substituted in the 77th minute for Davor Landeka in the 1–0 win.

On 28 July 2012, Brahimi scored his first goal for Grasshopper against FC Basel three minutes after he came off the bench on the 80th minute.

Panionios
On 14 January 2018, Panionios officially announced the capture of Kosovo-Albanian Mërgim Brahimi. The 25-year-old international (with Kosovo National Team) attacking midfielder will replace experienced Iranian attacking midfielder Masoud Shojaei who recently joined rivals AEK Athens.

FC Wil
On 3 June 2019, it was confirmed that Brahimi a two-year contract with FC Wil with an option to one further year.

International career
Originating from Kosovo with ethnic Albanian parents and raised in Switzerland, Brahimi was eligible to play for Switzerland, Albania and Kosovo if a national team should be formed, but in March 2011 he answered the call by Albania's Under-21 coach Artan Bushati for a non official friendly tournament held in Slovenia.

On 26 August 2011 Brahimi was called up by Switzerland U-20 for two friendlies against Italy and Germany in September, but he refused the offer and decided to represent Albania instead.

He officially gained Albanian citizenship on 26 August 2011 along with his Grasshopper teammate Imran Bunjaku, in order to compete in the UEFA Under-21 Championship qualifiers .

Albania senior team
He received his first senior international call up for friendliest by Gianni De Biasi against Qatar and Iran in May 2012.

Brahimi made his  international debut on 27 May 2012 against Iran, at age of 19.

Switzerland under-21
Brahimi switched to play for Switzerland national under-21 football team in 2013–15 season. He scored 2 goals in 4 qualifying matches.

Kosovo senior team
Brahimi switched his nationality again in 2015. He scored a brace in his debut match for Kosovo national football team, against Equatorial Guinea. He also played another match for Kosovo in November 2015.

He was invited by Albert Bunjaki, in a friendly with Faroe Islands on 3 June 2016. That match was the first match of Kosovo as a member of FIFA. However, as he also played for national teams of Albania and Switzerland, his switch to Kosovo competitively was dependent on the approval of FIFA's Bureau of the Players' Status Committee. Brahimi and Football Federation of Kosovo had to submit a formal request to the committee in order to know the eligibility of Brahimi.

To sum up, Brahimi played twice for Kosovo in friendlies, but did not made his competitive debut yet.

Career statistics

Club

International

References

External links

Profile at FSHF
Switzerland U21 stats

1992 births
Living people
People from Istog
Kosovan footballers
Kosovo international footballers
Swiss men's footballers
Switzerland under-21 international footballers
Albanian footballers
Albania international footballers
Albania under-21 international footballers
Kosovo Albanians
Swiss people of Kosovan descent
Swiss people of Albanian descent
Kosovan emigrants to Switzerland
Association football forwards
Dual internationalists (football)
Grasshopper Club Zürich players
FC Aarau players
FC Wohlen players
Panionios F.C. players
FC Wil players
Kosovan expatriate footballers
Albanian expatriate footballers
Swiss expatriate footballers
Kosovan expatriate sportspeople in Greece
Albanian expatriate sportspeople in Greece
Swiss expatriate sportspeople in Greece
Expatriate footballers in Greece
Swiss Super League players
Sportspeople from Peja